Cebrail Makreckis (born 10 May 2000) is a Latvian footballer who plays as a midfielder for Bulgarian club Pirin Blagoevgrad.

Club career
On 19 January 2022, Makreckis joined 3. Liga club Viktoria 1889 Berlin.

Career statistics

Club

Notes

References

2000 births
Living people
Latvian footballers
Egyptian footballers
Latvian people of German descent
Latvia youth international footballers
German footballers
Association football midfielders
Regionalliga players
3. Liga players
First Professional Football League (Bulgaria) players
Bayer 04 Leverkusen players
SV Bergisch Gladbach 09 players
Bonner SC players
Borussia Dortmund II players
FC Viktoria 1889 Berlin players
PFC Pirin Blagoevgrad players
Latvian expatriate footballers
Expatriate footballers in Bulgaria